Little Boot Lake is a lake in Beltrami County, Minnesota, in the United States.

Little Boot Lake was named from the fact its outline resembles a boot.

See also
List of lakes in Minnesota

References

Lakes of Minnesota
Lakes of Beltrami County, Minnesota